Yecheon Air Base  is a military airport located in Yecheon, South Korea.

See also

List of airports in South Korea

References

External links

South Korean airbases